See:
 For Pedestrian precinct, see Pedestrian zone
 For shopping centres, see Shopping mall